Seastrom is a surname. Notable people with the surname include:

Dorothy Seastrom (1903–1930), American silent film actress
Marilyn Seastrom (born 1951), American statistician
Victor Seastrom (1879–1960), Swedish film director, screenwriter, and actor